Ṣāliḥ ibn ʻAbd Allāh Ibn Ḥumayd (Saleh bin Abdullah bin Humaid; born 1949), is a Saudi Arabian Imam and politician. He is currently one of the nine Imams of Grand Mosque of Mecca. He is also member of Assembly of Saudi Arabia since 1993 and had served Speaker of Majlis al Shura from February 2002 to February 2009.

Biography 
Salih Humaid is member of Saudi Majlis al Shura (Consultative Assembly of Saudi Arabia) since 1993 and the Speaker of Majlis al Shura from February 2002 to February 2009. He is currently imam of Masjid al-Haram (Grand Mosque of Mecca). He is also a member of the Arabic Language Academy in Mecca, and the President of the International Islamic Fiqh Academy in Jeddah.

He won the 2016 Service to Islam award from the King Faisal International Prize. Among many other distinguish awards.

He is the son of Abdullah bin Humaid.

References 

1949 births
Living people
Speakers of the Consultative Assembly of Saudi Arabia